Horton Kirby Boys Home also known as Home for Little Boys was a private railway station opened in 1870 by the London, Chatham and Dover Railway to serve "Home for Little Boys", a cottage homes village in Horton Kirby, which was opened in 1867. It only had a 'down' platform (direction Longfield) and there was no 'up' platform. The station closed by 1930 and was demolished in 1939.

References

Disused railway stations in Kent
Railway stations in Great Britain opened in 1870
Railway stations in Great Britain closed in 1930
1870 establishments in England
1930 disestablishments in England
Buildings and structures in Sevenoaks District
Former private railway stations